Old Bar is a coastal town in New South Wales, Australia in Mid-Coast Council.

Geography 
Old Bar is on the southern side of the mouth of the Manning River.

Demographics
It grew rapidly during a boom in housing in 1988.

Airstrip	
Old Bar is a common place for light aircraft to land. Old Bar Airfield is an authorised landing area and is heritage listed.

2019 Bushfire
In November 2019, a bushfire that started at Hillville, south of Taree, jumped the Pacific Highway into the path of Old Bar and Wallabi Point. The day before, the NSW Rural Fire Service told residents in these areas to get out or defend. One home was confirmed lost on Old Bar Road.

Heritage listings
Old Bar has a number of heritage-listed sites, including:
 0.5 km off Old Bar Road: Old Bar Airfield

References 

Coastal towns in New South Wales
Beaches of New South Wales
Suburbs of Mid-Coast Council
Surfing locations in New South Wales